Eupithecia lacteolata is a moth in the family Geometridae. It is found in Russia and Turkey.

References

Moths described in 1906
lacteolata
Moths of Asia